The Iranian Mosque (also known as the Imam Hussein Mosque) located in Satwa, Dubai, is a Shia mosque founded by the Iranian community.

It is located on Al Wasl Road, a short distance from the Jumeirah Mosque. Its architecture is inspired by quasi-Fatimid and Persian influences, with its facade and dome covered in traditional blue tiles, much like the exterior of the Iranian Hospital across the road. The mosque sprawls over an area of 2,500 square metres and was built in 1979 with the support of the Iranian Red Crescent. It contains several interior halls and rooms, and has a library with over 14,000 books of diverse topics and languages including Arabic, Persian, Urdu and English. The Sheikh Mohammed Centre for Cultural Understanding runs four weekly tours of the mosque, during which non-Muslims visitors can visit.

See also
 Iranian Mosque, Bur Dubai
 Shia Islam in the United Arab Emirates
 List of mosques in the United Arab Emirates

References

1979 establishments in the United Arab Emirates
Iranian diaspora in the United Arab Emirates
Mosques in Dubai
Mosques completed in 1979
Shia Islam in the United Arab Emirates
Shia mosques in the United Arab Emirates